Sigurd Brekke (15 October 1890 – 25 April 1958) was a Norwegian footballer. He played in one match for the Norway national football team in 1910.

References

External links
 

1890 births
1958 deaths
Norwegian footballers
Norway international footballers
Footballers from Oslo
Association football forwards